The Matrix Market exchange formats are a set of human readable, ASCII-based file formats designed to facilitate the exchange of matrix data.  The file formats were designed and adopted for the Matrix Market, a NIST repository for test data for use in comparative studies of algorithms for numerical linear algebra.

See also 
 Harwell-Boeing file format

References

External links 
 Matrix Market exchange formats

Computer file formats